Eko Boys' High School is a school in Lagos that was founded on 13 January 1913, by Rev. William Benjamin Euba, a Methodist Reverend, who desired to establish a secondary school that would provide educational opportunities for the less privilege citizens of Lagos.

Alumni

Amongst the Old boys of the school are: 
retired Brigadier Ola Oni
Late Dr Abubakar Olusola Saraki
retired Major General Adeyinka Adebayo
Chief Gabriel Igbinedion
Governor Babatunde Fashola
Akiogun of Iru Land
Oba Idowu Abiodun Oniru
Onilogbo of Ilogbo
Oba Ayinde Olaleye
Chief Segun Olushola
Chief Idowu Sofola (SAN)
Late Justice Muri Okunola
Late Alao Aka-Bashorun (SAN)
Bisi Alimi
'Wagbemiga Mary-Peter Onifade
  Engr. Eke Emmanuel igbe

References

The history of Eko Boys High school by Dr Joseph Njor

External links
 https://web.archive.org/web/20091213010730/http://www.thisdayonline.com/archive/2004/01/07/20040107edu03.html

Boys' schools in Nigeria
Schools in Lagos
1913 establishments in the Southern Nigeria Protectorate
Educational institutions established in 1913